Radio Moldova Internațional (RMI) was the second publicly funded radio broadcaster in Moldova.

External links 
Radio Moldova Internațional Website 
Podcast of RMI's English broadcasts

Mass media in Chișinău
Public radio stations in Moldova
Radio stations disestablished in 2013
Radio stations established in 1992
Romanian-language radio stations in Moldova
Teleradio-Moldova